Batuhan Özgür (born 1 February 1998 in Alanya) is a Turkish cyclist, who currently rides for UCI Continental team Sofer Savini Due OMZ.

Major results

2015
 1st  Road race, National Junior Road Championships
2017
 4th Road race, National Road Championships
 6th Belgrade Banjaluka II
2018
 1st Stage 3 Tour of Black Sea
 2nd Overall Tour of Mediterrennean
1st  Points classification
 4th Road race, National Road Championships
 5th Overall Tour of Fatih Sultan Mehmet
1st  Points classification
1st Stage 2
2019
 1st Overall Tour of Mevlana
1st Stages 1 & 2
 Les Challenges de la Marche Verte
2nd GP Sakia El Hamra
2nd GP Oued Eddahab
 4th Overall Tour of Black Sea
1st Stage 1
 4th Bursa Yıldırım Bayezıt Race
 4th Odessa Grand Prix
 6th Grand Prix Velo Alanya
 9th Bursa Orhangazi Race
2020
 8th GP Antalya
2021
 2nd Road race, National Road Championships
 7th Kahramanmaraş Grand Prix
2022
 1st  Sprints classification Tour of Turkey
 10th Grand Prix Velo Manavgat

References

External links

1998 births
Living people
Turkish male cyclists
People from Alanya
Competitors at the 2018 Mediterranean Games
Mediterranean Games competitors for Turkey
20th-century Turkish people
21st-century Turkish people